The Mahalak Bluffs are a discontinuous line of bluffs,  long, on the north side of Solberg Inlet, Bowman Coast, Antarctica. The feature was photographed from the air by Lincoln Ellsworth, 21 November 1935, and was mapped from these photographs by W.L.G. Joerg. It was named by the Advisory Committee on Antarctic Names in 1977 for Lieutenant Lawrence W. Mahalak, Jr., U.S. Navy, Medical Officer at Palmer Station for Operation Deep Freeze, 1971.

References

Cliffs of Graham Land
Bowman Coast